The Convention People's Party (CPP) is a socialist political party in Ghana based on the ideas of the first President of Ghana, Kwame Nkrumah. The CPP was formed in June 1949 after Nkrumah broke away from the United Gold Coast Convention (UGCC).

Party origins

The Convention People's Party is descended from a line of political movements formed in the early half of the 20th century to spearhead the anti-colonial struggle in the Gold Coast. The movement that preceded it was the United Gold Coast Convention (UGCC) formed in August 1947 and led predominantly by members of the professional and business classes. To expand its support base and step up the struggle for independence, the leadership of the UGCC decided to appoint a permanent general secretary to lead its expansion and step up the pace of change. Ebenezer Ako Adjei, then a young lawyer, was offered the paid secretaryship of the UGCC but he declined the position and instead proposed Kwame Nkrumah a political activist then in London, for the position. Ako Adjei had known Nkrumah as a fellow at Lincoln University in the United States and at the London School of Economics. He was also the past President of the West African Students Union (WASU) in London which first hosted Nkrumah when he arrived in Britain from the United States.

The leadership of the UGGG accepted Ako Adjei's suggestion and agreed to invite Kwame Nkrumah, who already had a wide reputation as an experienced political organizer with a gift for leadership. Together with George Padmore and others he had organised in 1945 the Fifth Pan-African Congress in Manchester, England. Nkrumah personally drew up the dynamic Declaration to the Colonial Peoples of the World, approved and adopted by the Congress. He was an eminently suitable person to galvanize the mass of the Gold Coast people and the youth to play an active part in the national liberation movement.

Initially Nkrumah was hesitant about accepting the position, being aware that both the composition and objectives of the UGCC fell far short of the radical, political program he envisaged for the Gold Coast and for Africa. But after discussion with his colleagues he decided to accept, knowing that it might not be long before he would find it impossible to continue working within the UGCC. On 14 November 1947, Kwame Nkrumah set sail from Liverpool aboard the SS Accra, accompanied by Kojo Botsio, another friend from London who was also member of WASU and with that, the beginning of a new chapter in the modern political history of Ghana begun.

Kwame Nkrumah was officially introduced to the UGCC's Working Committee as their Secretary on 28 December 1947 and soon got to work seeking to expand the support base of the UGCC by mobilizing the youth through local youth societies in the Colony (e.g., Apowa Literary and Social Club) and the Ashanti Confederacy (e.g., Asante Youth Association- AYA), whose members were farmers, petty-traders, drivers, artisans, school, teachers, clerks and letter-writers, many of whom were the growing number of elementary-school-leavers.  In the beginning, the UGCC had only a handful of branches in the larger coastal towns and Kibi; it had no official presence in Ashanti and there had been no attempt to enlist support for the organisation in the Northern territories. Nkrumah set about to change this, travelling extensively and organizing mass meetings and within six months hundreds of branches of the UGCC had been established throughout the

The 1948 riots

At the time of Nkrumah's arrival in the Gold Coast in late 1947, there was growing discontent among ordinary people with the economy due to shortages of consumer goods and rising prices. Farmers were dissatisfied with the policy of cutting-out cocoa trees ravaged by the swollen-shoot disease with no compensation. Ex-servicemen who had fought in World War II for ‘King and country’ had only been awarded a meagre gratuity and were experiencing the same hardships as the general populace.

Neither the chiefs nor the political class championed the growing disaffection in the country and it fell to Nii Kwabena Bonnne II, Osu Alata Mantse,  to lead the agitation against growing economic hardship and especially the rising prices of consumer goods. Just over a month after Nkrumah's arrival in the Gold Coast the growing discontent found expression in a boycott of mostly foreign-owned trading firms organized by Nii Kwabena Bonnne on 26 January 1948.

The boycott continued for a month while its leaders negotiated price reductions with the government and the trading firms -Association of West African Merchants (AWAM).
There was unrest also among the ex-servicemen and both Kwame Nkrumah and Dr. Joseph Boakye Danquah addressed them at a rally in Accra on 20 February 1948. A petition expressing their grievances was drawn up to be presented to the Governor.

Nii Kwabena Bonne's boycott agreed new reduced prices that were to come into effect on 28 February 1948 and the boycott of the foreign trading firms was called off. As fate, would have it, however, on that same day, 28 February, the ex-servicemen set off to march to Christiansborg Castle to present their petition. Their way was blocked by armed police commanded by a British officer, Superintendent Colin Imray. When the marchers refused to halt, Imray gave the order to open fire. Three ex-servicemen – Sgt. Adjetey, Private Odartey Lamptey and Corporal Attipoe – were killed and many others were injured. News of the shooting sparked off days of rioting in Accra by already angry crowds incensed at the high price of food, which they blamed on the greed of foreign merchants. Shops and offices owned by foreigners were attacked and looted. Violence spread to other towns.

Faced with widespread disorder, the Governor, Sir Gerald Creasy, declared a state of emergency. Troops were called out while police arrested so-called trouble makers. The executive committee of the UGCC sent telegrams to A. Creech Jones, British Secretary of State for the Colonies, asking for a Special Commissioner to be sent to the Gold Coast with power to call a Constituent Assembly.

Leaders of the UGCC — J. B. Danquah, Ofori Atta, Akufo Addo, Ako Adjei, Obetsebi Lamptey and Kwame Nkrumah, subsequently known as The Big Six, were arrested and flown to the Northern Territories where they were detained for six weeks before being taken to Accra to appear at a Commission of Enquiry set up by the Governor under the chairmanship of Aiken Watson Q.C.

After interrogating the accused, the Watson commissioners concluded Nkrumah was mainly to blame for the disorders. In their words: "The U.G.C.C. did not really get down to business until the arrival of Mr. Nkrumah on 16 December 1947." They correctly detected that Nkrumah's political objectives were far more progressive than those of his colleagues. They recommended the drafting of a new constitution to replace the outdated Burns constitution. As a result, in December 1948, a constitutional committee was appointed by the Governor under the chairmanship of Mr Justice Coussey.

The leadership of the UGCC blamed Nkrumah for the riots and some, including Obestebi-Lamptey and William Ofori-Atta, ransacked his house looking for evidence that he was a communist. It was becoming clear that differences between Nkrumah and other leaders of the UGCC would soon make it impossible for them to continue to work together.

Although the detentions increased the popularity of the UGCC leaders, it also led to infighting and finger-pointing among the U.G.CC leadership and created a split between the conservative intelligentsia of the UGCC who favoured a gradualist approach to independence on one hand, and the radical "Veranda Boys", on the other, who listened willingly to Nkrumah and were opposed to the convention.

The appointment and acceptance of some UGCC members including J. B. Danquah as members of the Justice Coussey's "Committee on Constitutional Reform" enabled Nkrumah to organize the local youth societies on which the UGCC was based while lawyers of the UGCC, then on good terms with the Colonial administration were absorbed in the Coussey committee meetings.

In August 1948 the "Committee on Youth Organizations" was formed with K. A. Gbedemah as chair and Kojo Botsio as Secretary. Dr. Danquah and his colleagues had become alarmed at the rapidly growing support of their members for Nkrumah and his dynamic leadership. They disapproved of his founding of the Committee on Youth Organisation (CYO), regarding it as a pressure group advancing Nkrumah's determination to speed up the campaign for self-government. The CYO adopted the slogan "Self-Government Now", in contrast to the UGCC slogan "Self-Government in the shortest possible time". They feared Nkrumah's policy might lead to further disorder and further arrests.

Nkrumah was called before the UGCC Working Committee and suspended from his post as general secretary following questioning about his persistent use of the word "Comrade" as a term of address and his continued connections with the West African National Secretariat in London.

The UGCC leadership was determined to remove Nkrumah as general secretary. After the publication of the first issue of The Accra Evening News founded and managed by Nkrumah and edited by K. A. Gbedemah in September 1948, UGCC's main financier affectionately known as Paa Grant demanded Nkrumah's removal from office. At a meeting of the UGCC executive in Saltpond, matters came to a head and Nkrumah's private secretary was dismissed and Nkrumah himself demoted to the position of treasurer which he at first refused but later accepted in November 1948.

Nkrumah and his supporters became increasingly exasperated at what they saw as the timidity of the UGCC By mid-1949, with the mass of the people and the youth behind him, Nkrumah and his colleagues were in a strong position to split with the UGCC to form a new party.

Birth of the CPP 

After a three-day meeting of the CYO in early June, 1949 in Tarkwa one faction led by K. A. Gbedemah and Kojo Bostio advocated for a clean break with the UGCC while another, led by Kofi Baako's faction demanded Nkrumah's reinstatement as general secretary of the UGCC to enable them to capture the convention from within. The compromise reached was that a new party be formed but should retain the name "Convention".

On 11 June 1949 the Working Committee of the UGCC issued two resolutions declaring that membership of the CYO and the UGCC were incompatible and gave notice that Nkrumah was to be "served with charges" for disregarding "the obligations of collective responsibility and party discipline" and by publishing in The Accra Evening News, views, opinions, and criticisms, "assailing the decisions and questioning the integrity of the Working Committee", he had undermined the convention, abused its leaders and stolen its ideas.

A day later, on 12 June 1949, before a crowd of some 60,000 people which had gathered on the Old Polo Ground, the CPP was born and Kwame Nkrumah resigned as general secretary of the UGCC.  He declared that the CYO had decided to break away from the UGCC to become an entirely separate political party, the CPP.

Kojo Botsio sent a telegram to the UGCC. Working Committee informing them about the formation of the CPP under the chairmanship of Nkrumah with the aim of "Self-Government Now for Chiefs and People of the Gold Coast, a democratic government and a higher living standard for the people". The UGCC Working Committee responded with a statement on 15 June 1949 warning members that the convention had nothing to do with the newly formed CPP, and that Paa Grant expects loyalty from all UGCC members and considers "formation [of a] new political party inimical to interests of [the] country".

Wiser heads in UGCC understood danger ahead and appealed for a resolution of the conflict. On 26 June 1949 arbitrators were appointed to examine the dispute between Nkrumah and the UGCC Working Committee and an emergency conference of the UGCC, youth groups and the CPP met in Saltpond. But it was too late: the CPP made a clean break with the UGCC at the conference when there was no agreement on the condition that a new Working Committee be elected following Nkrumah's acceptance to disband the CPP and resume general secretaryship of the UGCC.

The foundation of the CPP marked a decisive turning point in the history of Ghana. For it led directly to the achievement of Ghana's independence on 6 March 1957.

CPP colours, motto, symbol and structure

The colours of the party were to be red, white and green, the tricolour flag in horizontal form with red at the top, white in the centre and green at the bottom.

Party motto: FORWARD EVER BACKWARD NEVER

Its symbol: A red cockerel heralding the dawn.

Party branches were to be established in every town and village, throughout the country. It was to be a mass-based party each branch of which was to be administered by an elected Branch Executive committee. There was to be a National Secretariat under the direct supervision and control of the Central Committee of the party.

Members of the first Central Committee were:
 Kwame Nkrumah (Chairman)
 Kojo Botsio (Secretary)
 K. A. Gbedemah
 N. A. Welbeck
 Kwesi Plange
 Kofi Baako
 Krobo Edusei
 Dzenkle Dzewu
 Ashie Nikoi
 B.E. Dwira

Positive Action

The Evening News became the party's mouthpiece and its full-frontal demands for self-government increased its popularity and demand rose dramatically. Its pithy mottoes were:

 We have a right to live as men
 We prefer self-government with danger to servitude in tranquility
 We have the right to govern ourselves

The success of the Evening News encouraged Nkrumah to launch the Morning Telegraph in Sekondi in 1949 with Kwame Afriyie, who later became party general secretary, as editor. This was followed by the Cape Coast Daily Mail edited by Kofi Baako. Also B. E. Dwira founded the Freedom Press and Publishing Company in Ashanti region, precisely Kumasi, and published the Ashanti Sentinel newspaper with the motto "We Speak the Truth Without Fear". The paper was used to promote the CPP and Nkrumah's ideologies and vision for a better and prosperous Ghana and Africa. B. E. Dwira was the first Ashanti regional chairman of the CPP before the demarcation of the Brong Ahafo Region in April 1959. He also was the first Chairman of the Kumasi City Council (now called Mayor of Kumasi). 

The CPP suspected the Colonial Government and the Gold Coast establishment wanted to use the Coussey Committee on Constitutional Reform as a ruse to delay indefinitely progress towards independence.  Anticipating that the Coussey constitutional proposals would be unacceptable, plans had been made for Positive Action which Nkrumah explained in a statement written in 1949 entitled "What I mean by Positive Action".

He listed the weapons of Positive Action as:
 Legitimate political agitation
 Newspaper and educational campaigns
 As a last resort, the constitutional application of strikes, boycotts, and non-cooperation based on the principle of absolute non-violence.
 The final stage of Positive Action would only be employed if all other avenues to achieve self-government had been closed.

As expected, the Coussey Committee's constitutional proposals provided for very limited African participation in government and Nkrumah described it as ‘fraudulent and bogus’. The colonial government even sought to limit the proposals further by objecting to the committee's proposal that the Executive Council (i.e. the cabinet) be answerable to the majority African Legislative Council. In a memorandum anticipating the recommendations of the committee, the colonial office argued that "collective responsibility of ministers to the legislature instead of to the Governor was only compatible with the final stage of internal self-government". Despite the existence of the UGCC and CPP, the colonial government argued there were no organized political parties in the Gold Coast and as such it would be "wrong for H.M.G. to grant to the Gold Coast a degree of self-government greater than accorded Jamaica where parties exist[ed] and where political life was more mature"

The proposals of the Coussey Committee were published in October 1949 but it was clear from the outset that they were at variance with the CPP's campaigning objective of "self-government NOW". Worse still, it confirmed the CPP's suspicion that the colonial government wanted to delay the transition to self-rule.

The CPP and the Trades Union Congress organized a mass gathering of some fifty organizations drawn from various trade unions, farmers’ cooperatives and organizations and other educational, cultural, youth, social and women groups in what became known as the "Ghana Representative Assembly".  The UGCC and the Aborigines’ Rights Protection Society were invited but they turned it down.

The assembly passed the following resolution:

"That the people of the Gold Coast be granted immediate self-government by the British Government, that is full Dominion status within the British Commonwealth of Nations based on the statute of Westminster. That the assembly respectfully demands the immediate grant and sanction of full self-government for the chiefs and people of the Gold Coast."

Copies of the resolution were passed to the governing classes including the Governor, the Colonial Secretary, the Legislative Council and the three Territorial Councils of chiefs but they ignored it.

In the meantime, there was disquiet among the trade unions who demanded the reinstatement of meteorological service workers sacked for going on strike on 5 October 1949 and threatened to call a general strike if their call was not heeded. The CPP leadership travelled across the county mobilizing support for Positive Action and issued an ultimatum to the government to reinstate the meteorological workers by 7 January 1950.

On 15 December, the executive committee of the CPP informed the Governor, Sir Charles Arden-Clarke, that unless the legitimate aspirations of the people as embodied in the proposed amendments to the Coussey Committee's report were accepted, the CPP would declare Positive Action. The Governor was given two weeks in which to accede to the CPP's request for the calling of a Constituent Assembly.

Nkrumah met the Colonial Secretary and on the basis of the assurance given that the CPP's. view would be considered by committees on constitutional reform, he agreed to recommend a review of the Positive Action policy to the party's executive committee. Dr J. B. Danquah seized upon this temporary hiatus in the Positive Action campaign and accused Kwame Nkrumah of "letting the country down by his volte face in calling off positive action in return for empty promises from the Government".

Needless to say, after several meetings with colonial authorities it became clear that no progress was being made on the central demand for a constituent assembly or the reinstatement of the meteorological workers. On 8 January 1950, in front of a large CPP crowd at a public meeting in Accra, Nkrumah declared positive action. He called for a general strike to include all except those engaged in maintaining essential services such as hospitals and water supplies. Shops and offices closed. Roads and rail services came to a standstill.  He travelled to Sekondi, Cape Coast and Takoradi to declare Positive Action there too.

The colonial government responded on 10 January by declaring a state of emergency, banned processions, imposed curfews, and ordered the disconnection of public services in certain areas. The offices of CPP newspapers were raided and closed.

The CPP and TUC leaders, including Bankole Awoonor Renner, Tommy Hutton Mills, Pobee Binney and Kojo Botsio and Anthony Woode were rounded up and arrested. Two CPP newspapers – The Accra Evening News and the Cape Coast Daily Mail- were banned and their editors J. Markham and Kofi Baako arrested.

On 19 January, at a meeting of the Legislative Council, the government passed three bills – the Sedition Bill, a newspaper registration bill and a Bill to allow the Governor-in-council to impose curfew in any part of the country without having to resort to emerging legislation.  On 21 January, Kwame Nkrumah was arrested and tried for inciting an illegal strike and for sedition for an article in the Cape Coast Daily Mail. He was sentenced to three years imprisonment.  Several thousand workers were dismissed from their jobs and many others lost their pension rights.

Things would never be the same again. The CPP had shown that an unarmed people could demonstrate the effectiveness of unified effort in the form of Positive Action. Never again would they accept that it was hopeless to challenge a seemingly mighty power structure. The political revolution in the Gold Coast had begun in earnest.

1951 Elections

The imprisonment of the CPP leadership created a political vacuum which the then Governor said he was "anxious to fill without delay" by rallying "moderate opinion in support of the plan for the constitutional advance set out in the Coussey report and His Majesty's Government statement, with a view to encouraging the emergence of a strong moderate party sufficiently cohesive and vocal to deal with such dissident elements as retain any substantial popular following" (emphasis added).

In the meantime, K.A Gbedemah who had been released from an earlier arrest in October 1949, kept the central organization of the party running and was in constant touch with Nkrumah who was held in James Fort prison from where messages were smuggled out on toilet paper to party headquarters. Nkrumah was helped by a friendly warder who managed to smuggle messages to party headquarters, where the work of the CPP was continuing. A concise CPP election manifesto, written on sheets of toilet paper, was delivered to CPP/HQ in this way. CPP manifestos were always short, simple and direct leaving the electorate in no doubt about what a CPP victory would mean. They expressed just what the majority of the people wanted. As 1951 election result showed, the CPP correctly gauged the pulse of the nation.

In the 1950 municipal elections held in the major cities – Accra (April), Cape Coast (June) and Kumasi (November), – the CPP swept the board with stunning, if unexpected victories. In the Kumasi municipal election, the CPP won ALL contested seats and opposition attempts to attribute this stunning victory to CPP intimidation was swiftly discredited by two European journalists who observed and reported on the elections. In a dispatch by the Governor to the Colonial Office on 2 November he wrote:

"I am informed that the reason for the sweeping success of CPP in obtaining all contested seats was due to real organizing capacity and that the debacle of the opposition was due to apathy and not to intimidation"

The colonial government began to revise its view of the CPP describing it as "clearly more politically skillful than any mere hooligan element could have been".

As plans for the elections to the legislative assembly gathered pace, the CPP took what Governor Arden Clarke was later to describe as a "decisive stroke" to put up Kwame Nkrumah, who was still serving his term of imprisonment in James Fort,  as the candidate for Accra Central –now part of today's Odododiodoo constituency. Once again the CPP achieved a stunning victory in the February 1951 Gold Coast legislative election.  In 1951 the manifesto could be summed up in three words: Self-Government NOW.

The party won the directly elected urban seats with ten times as many votes as those of the combined opposition with Nkrumah polling a massive 22,780 out of the available 23,122 votes in his Accra Central constituency. In the thirty-three rural seats elected indirectly through electoral colleges, the CPP secured a stunning 29 seats to UGCC's three. In the two-member constituency of the Akim Abuakwa Dr. J. B. Danquah and William Ofori Atta got through by the barest of squeaks – with majorities of 10 and 4 electoral college votes respectively –  in their ancestral homeland. Dr K. A. Busia on the other hand, lost his seat and owed his seat in the Legislative Assembly as representative for the Ashanti Confederacy Council.

Soon after the elections, the CPP wrote to the Governor seeking a deputation to discuss the immediate release of Kwame Nkrumah from prison. So that he did not appear to have been forced, the Governor delayed the decision until after the Territorial Council elections that weekend and then made arrangements for Nkrumah's release for 1 p.m. on the following Monday claiming it was "an act of grace".

The first All-African Government

At the age of 39, Kwame Nkrumah became the Leader of Government Business of the first All-African Government whose other ministers included Archie Casely-Hayford, K. A. Gbedemah, Kojo Botsio, Dr A. Ansah Koi, Dr E. O. Asafu-Adjaye, and Mr J. A. Briamah.

In February 1952, Nkrumah won a significant concession after he successfully persuaded the colonial administration to amend the 1951 constitution to change his title from Leader of Government Business to Prime Minister and the Executive Council recast as the Cabinet. From now on, the Prime Minister would rank second to Governor in Cabinet and will preside over the affairs of state in his absence and the first African government would begin to look just like one.

The new government got down to work with the approval and implementation of the five-year and accelerated development plan (see next section).  The government set up a social welfare department with community developments teams in rural areas undertaking a myriad of local projects ranging from the provision of local schools, to water and public lavatories in towns and villages across country. A share of the proceeds from higher cocoa prices on the international market was passed on to the farmers with the Cocoa Marketing Board paying "an unprecedented price of 80s, a load of the main crops 1951–52". The resumption of the policy of cutting-out swollen-shoot infected trees was also accompanied by increased compensation to farmers affected.

In its first year of operation, the Cocoa Purchasing Company set up by the government paid loans of over £1 million to farmers to alleviate decades of farmer indebtedness and although the colonial administration had acknowledged posed a danger to the industry, they had failed to deal with it. While cocoa prices in the international markets were high, the industry, ravaged by the swollen shoot disease, was in decline. The Watson Commission had predicted a possible total disappearance "in 20 years" if this was not tackled head-on.

The government kicked-off a number projects including the Volta River hydro-electric project and a new harbour at Tema with a connecting railway line to Accra. There were also extensions to Takoradi harbour and improvements to Accra harbour.

The first five-year development plan
The first five-year development plan of £120 million sterling was approved by the Legislative Assembly on 15 August 1951 and replaced the 10-year Development Plan of £11.5 million sterling drawn up in 1948. By comparison, the 10-year development plan of Guggisberg period between the two world wars (1919 – 1938), had an expenditure of £16.5 million.

The plan concentrated on education (under the Accelerated Plan for Education) communications, public works and general services to prepare the way for Ghana's industrialization drive. The CPP government introduced free and compulsory primary and middle school education which was aimed at the total literacy of the country by 1970.

Average capital expenditure per year for the First Development Plan was £15.5 million; 11.2% spent on Agriculture, Forestry and Fishing, and Industry and mining and 88.8% spent on Social Services (Education, Health and sanitation, Housing, Public Administration, Police and Prisons and other Social Services) and Infrastructure (Roads, Railways and Inland waterways, Ports and harbours, Shipping, Posts and Telecommunications, Electricity and Water and Sewerage).

By the end of 1955, CPP government had achieved the following:

Education
 Primary schools enrollment doubled; Middle schools enrollment increased by 50%.
Nine (9) new Teacher Training Colleges; 18 new secondary schools with the number of students attending increased almost 3-fold;Technical training enrolments increased from 180 to 1,400
 Four secondary schools added to Achimota School, the only secondary school offering the Higher School Certificate (A-level): Mfantsipim School, Adisadel College, St. Augustine's College and Prempeh College
 Kumasi College of Technology established and also offered the Higher School Certificate
 Kumasi (1954) and Sekondi (1955) Regional Libraries
 The Ghana Library service
 Agriculture and Infrastructure
 18 Agricultural stations;11 cocoa stations; 4 Agricultural Training Centers; soil surveys over hundreds of square miles
 940 wells and 62 bore holes sunk; 7 new pipe-borne water supplies with additional 4 under construction
 38 miles of new railways; 15 miles re-directed railways with 50 miles under construction; 828 miles of major roads built or reconstructed; 730 miles resurfaced with bitumen; 2 major bridges completed and 60 smaller bridges built; 4 major bridges including Adomi bridge under construction
 Takoradi harbour expanded, and Tema harbour under construction
 Okomfo Anokye hospital construction started; extensions to 15 existing hospitals and 2 health centres near completion
 270 miles of overhead telephone trunk routes; 140 miles of underground cable; 4,800 new telephones installed (3–fold increase in capacity); 13 new post office buildings completed and the size of the General Post Office doubled
 Construction of Ambassador Hotel started; 15,000 room units of housing for 40,000 people completed
 60% increase in electricity output 51,000 KW from 32,000 KW

These developments so increased the living standards of ordinary citizens that at independence, Ghana's GDP per capita was £50 compared to about £300 for the UK, and was higher compared to India, Pakistan and Ceylon.

The Motion of Destiny and the 1954 elections
In June 1952, the new Secretary of State for the Colonies Oliver Lyttleton visited the Gold Coast and agreed to a process of consultation with chiefs and the people to proposal for constitutional changes. On the basis of proposals received from chiefs and a broad spectrum of groups and numerous consultations with the territorial council, the trade union congress and opposition parties, the government published a white paper on constitutional change on 19 June 1953 which were accepted as the basis for the transition to independence in December 1956.

On the basis of these proposals, the CPP government introduced a bill in the Legislative Assembly on 10 July 1953, famously dubbed by The Evening News as the "Motion of Destiny". This called upon Britain to make arrangement for independence. It required all members of the Assembly to be elected directly by secret ballot, and Cabinet members of the Assembly and directly responsible to it. Britain was asked for a clear commitment to independence by naming a date. Britain conceded the demand for independence but insisted on another election first.

The first directly held elections in the country's history took place on 19 June 1954 and the CPP won 72 out of 104 seats, the GCP (the last rump of the UGCC) were routed winning only 1 seat and so it was left to the Northern People's Party (NPP) with 12 seats to form the official opposition. Dr J. B. Danquah, and Mr. William Ofori-Atta both lost their seats and Dr K. A. Busia, won his seat by a mere 11 votes. However, the euphoria surrounding this massive victory was soon to turn sour with a sudden turn in events that ushered the country through a period of instability and violence, the like of which had never been seen before or since.

The violent years: 1954–1956

In March 1954, and before the June elections the government took a decision to fix the price of cocoa at £3.12 shillings in response to the Seers and Ross "Report on Finance and Physical Problems of Development in the Gold Coast" to contain looming inflation. Contrary to inaccurate historical accounts, the CPP did not promise in its manifesto to raise farm gate prices in its 1954 election and in August 1954, Mr. K.A. Gbedemah as finance minister introduced the Cocoa Duty and Development funds bill in parliament based on the cabinet's decision in the March.

In his presentation to parliament, Gbedemah argued that he was seeking to deal with the ‘fragility’ of the Gold Coast economy highlighted by the Seers and Ross report stemming from an over-reliance on one commodity for nearly 60 percent of export revenues. While cocoa prices were enjoying a boon on the world market in 1954, there was recognition by those who took a long-term view that this was unsustainable (as it turned out prices fell £500 per ton in 1954 to £200 in 1956) and in any case, the farmers needed to be shielded from such fluctuations through a guaranteed farm gate price.

As part of the diversification strategy to reduce the risk of over-dependence, any windfall would be used to expand other sectors of the economy. Naturally the farmers, who wanted a share of higher world prices for their produce were unhappy about this and demanded a repeal of the bill. However, what started out as the natural response of an aggrieved sector of the country over policy was hijacked by disgruntled political activists and leaders with a melange of grievances including those unhappy with Justice Van Lare's report on the allocation of seats for the Legislative Assembly in the 1954 elections. Some, including B. F. Kusi – who later stood as the parliamentary candidate and become a formidable member of parliament for opposition before and after independence, – challenged the basis of the electoral seat allocation by population. He famously proclaimed: "Ashanti is a nation … Population does not make a country"?

There was also dissatisfaction with the Cocoa Purchasing Company which was accused of using funds to help the CPP during the 1954 elections and disquiet among members of the CPP who failed in the bids to become candidates in the 1954 election and were asked to stand down as independents or face expulsion from the party.

This toxic combination of disgruntled rumps hijacked genuine farmers’ grievances over the proposed fixed farm gate prices for cocoa and used it as an excuse to step up opposition to the elected government and in the process, fomented violence and mayhem that claimed the lives of many men, women and children needlessly.

The National Liberation Movement (NLM) launched in September 1954 under the leadership for the chief linguist of Ashantehene, Baffour Osei Akoto emerged from this disgruntled group, and the rump of the routed political opposition threw in their lot with them. The Asanteman Council and Asantehene lent their support and the NLM became a rallying nationalist organisation that was not only a critic of the democratically elected government but the leading advocate for Ashanti nationalism.

The NLM raided CPP offices in Ashanti and fomented violence indiscriminately and for the first time a group of nationalists in Ashanti decided to break with the consensus on the transitional plans for independence by declaring openly "yeate ye ho".

In March 1955, R. J. Vile, the Assistant Secretary at the Colonial Office gave one of the first independent assessments of the NLM after his visit to the Gold Coast.
"So little is known about the internal politics of the NLM that it is difficult to know the importance of this core determined people, or the kind of control exercised by the Ashantehene over them. It is, however, clear that they have a fair amount of dynamite at their disposal and presumably can easily obtain fresh supplies by theft from the mines. They contain a number of thugs who are prepared to use knives and arms of precision. Reports were current in Kumasi a fortnight ago that the NLM had been smuggling in rifles and machine-guns, and there were other reports that small bands of people were being trained with the object of sending them to Accra to attack, and possibly murder, Gold Coast Ministers."

He continued:

"It is possible that Dr. Nkrumah's peaceful approach (described in paragraph 10) may lead to the resolution of the differences between the NLM and the CPP on constitutional matters". Nevertheless, he concluded, ominously, that "it is quite possible that the core of determined young men will take to the forest and engage in guerrilla warfare from there if other methods fail".

Violence was stepped up and Kumasi became so dangerous that members of the CPP were in fear of their lives. Local party leaders such as the Ashanti Regional Chairman of CPP, Mr B. E. Dwira of New Tafo were barricaded in their homes and needed protection when they went out. Hon. B. E. Dwira's residence was bombed or dynamited. The CPP regional office was shutdown and the local party newspaper "The Ashanti Sentinel" and its publishing house founded by Hon. B. E. Dwira, the Ashanti Regional Chairman of the CPP was bombed and burnt to the ground by NLM party functionaries. Baffour Osei Akoto warned of a possible civil war and a U.K. newspaper described the situation as
"an unseen stealthy backstreet war being waged on Chicago lines with gunmen in fast cars, rifle, shotguns home-made bombs and broken bottles and knives".

The role of Hon. B. E. Dwira in the CPP (CONVENTION PEOPLE'S PARTY).*
Hon. B. E. Dwira (Benjamin Emmanuel Dwira) was the Ashanti Regional Chairman of the CPP, even before the demarcation of the Brong-Ahafo region in April 1959. It was during his regional chairmanship and leadership in Ashanti, that the civil unrest broke out between the CPP and the break away group that largely formed the NLM (National Liberation Movement), as "ya te yeho" or "ma te meho" (literally, "we have broken away" or "we have segregated/separated ourselves" or "I have segregated/separated myself". This led to more brutal, dastard, brazen attacks from the NLM as opposition so-called, against the CPP, particularly in Ahanti Region. Many CPP activists as "Action Troopers", were killed by the NLM functionaries. Hon. B. E. Dwira, personally laid to rest at least 47 out of the 49  CPP "Action Troopers" killed by the NLM functionaries.

There were more widespread killings perpetrated and committed by the NLM functionaries against the CPP party members at various locations in Ashanti region, some of which Hon. B. E. Dwira could not get to the bereaved family to help lay the dead to rest. Hon. B. E. Dwira's house was bombed or dynamited by the NLM functionaries, and his publishing company that published and printed the "Ashanti Sentinel"; a newspaper that he founded to promote the CPP and Prime Minister Osagyefo Dr. Kwame Nkrumah's ideologies, programmes, policies, and projects for Ghana (then Gold Coast) and Africa was bombed and burnt to the ground by the NLM functionaries.

So much harm and hurt and mayhem did the NLM cause the CPP in Ashanti region that most of the CPP members fled Ashanti region to other towns, villages and cities, in other parts of the country where they were known as "refugees". It was at the height of these political disturbances, disputations, disruptions, destructions and killings perpetrated by the NLM against the CPP members that the 1956 general elections was held to determine which party should lead the country into independence.

Hon. B. E. Dwira, organised the CPP "refugees" on the eve of the election day to come in buses and vans and trains to Ashanti Region and vote and after go back into hiding if they feared for their lives. The CPP won 8 out of the 21 seats in the elections thereby denying the NLM of the 2/3 (two-thirds) majority in Ashanti region that they had hoped to win; a condition set by the British government to determine the popularity and favourite party to lead the country into independence. On the national level the CPP won 71 majority out of the 104 seats inclusive of the 8 seats in Ashanti region.

The CPP was given the mandate to lead the country into independence which happened the following year on 6 March 1957. The Prime Minister of Ghana, Osagyefo Dr. Kwame Nkrumah, was full of gratitude and praise to Hon. B. E. Dwira for the brave leadership and chairmanship that he exhibited and demonstrated to help the CPP win the general elections thereby paving the way for Ghana's independence.

A photograph of Kwame Nkrumah congratulating and thanking Hon. B. E. Dwira in a handshake for the no mean feat achieved was taken at the house of Parliament at Accra in the presence of Hon. Kojo Botsio, E. R. T. Madjitey (first Ghanaian IGP) and others after the election results were declared.

A ballad was also composed in honour of B. E. Dwira dubbed "OKOKODUROFO DWIRA" (BRAVE DWIRA), which was played on air at the Ghana Broadcasting Corporation, during every independence day celebrations and occasion. Hon. B. E. Dwira, was appointed the first Mayor of Kumasi (then called Chairman of Kumasi City Council) soon after independence in 1957. There are many other positions that Hon. B. E. Dwira held both at home in Ghana and abroad under the CPP led government and political administration.

He died on 28 March 1985 having contributed so much to his dearly beloved country, Ghana. He was born on Sunday, 19 September 1909, a day after Kwame Nkrumah was also born, on Saturday, 18 September 1909. Note: Nkrumah's birthday of 18 September 1909 changed to 21 September 1909, as a result of a mistake in a later registration, which he came to accept himself, since for him it didn't make much difference to his life.

The Governor, Sir Charles Arden-Clarke was pelted with stones when he went to Kumasi to mediate and seek an end to the violence.  Kofi Banda was shot by a gunman from the Palace of the Chief of Ejisu – a crime for which no one was convicted. Krobo Edusei's sister was shot while preparing food for her children at home and Nkrumah's home in Accra New Town was bombed.

The CPP was keen to avoid the ‘Guyana trap’ that would reverse the gains made since 1951 and so its leadership urged restraint. Fourteen months after closing the party's offices in Kumasi, the CPP decided to re-open it and predictably, the occasion was met with violence perpetrated by the NLM. This time, the CPP responded and faced the NLM squarely. By December 1955 over 850 cases of assault had been reported in Kumasi alone of which less than a third had been brought to the courts.
The country was to be put through a protracted debate about federalism which had not been part of any discussion in the Coussey Constitutional proposals or in the most transparent and collective constitutional process of 1954.

Three times the NLM refused to attend a meeting with the Governor and Nkrumah to discuss their grievances. The government set up a parliamentary select committee to discuss the NLM's grievances – the opposition in the Assembly, led by Mr S. D. Dombo walked out and NLM boycotted the hearings of the select committee. The Governor went to Kumasi but he was stoned and humiliated.

Dr K. A. Busia travelled to London to see the Minister of State Alex Lennox-Boyd and requested that a constitutional expert be sent to mediate and yet, the NLM refused to co-operate with Sir Frederick Bourne when he arrived in Ghana. Although his recommendations were not favourable to the CPP by any means Sir Frederick described the NLM's demands as "an extreme form of federation" which "would introduce an intolerable handicap to the administration of the country".

The NLM was invited to the Achimota conference to discuss Sir Frederick Bourne's recommendations but refused to attend and instead insisted on a constituent assembly to draft a new federal constitution.

In the end, Secretary of State for the Colonies decided that the only way to settle the matter was through the will of the people and felt it necessary to hold one last election in 1956. The NLM happily accepted this challenge hoping that the alliances they had built with the other opposition parties would enable them secure victory at the polls.

The 1956 elections
The stage was set for settlement, once and for all, the opposing views of how an independent Ghana would be governed.  Once again, Mr K. A. Gbedemah led the CPP campaign and challenged the NLM's call for a federal constitution and revealed their true intentions by declaring:, "[w]hat they [NLM] want and have never been able to say openly is that THEY should be in office and not the C.P.P.".

Despite the NLM's argument that federalism was a natural way of organizing Ghana's regional and tribal groupings, when it had the opportunity to draft a new constitution for Ghana in 1969 it proposed a unitary form of government and conveniently side-stepped all of its previous arguments in favor of federation; regional assemblies were not established in the second republic neither were the fixed farm gate prices for cocoa reversed. Much of the basis of the NLM's violent campaign does not appear to been based on any principles but rooted, as Gbedemah had argued, in a deep-seated dislike for the CPP and Nkrumah.

In the course of the 1956 campaign, Gbedemah declared that if the CPP were defeated in the 1956 elections it would happily be a loyal opposition to an NLM government and he challenged that leader of the NLM, Dr Busia to give a similar undertaking. In a portent of how the opposition would behave post-independence, Dr. Busia openly declared instead that the NLM would "take steps IN and OUT of the Legislative Assembly" against the CPP, which he described as "evil".

The CPP election machine sprang into action, confident of a decisive result but taking no chances. As on previous occasions, the party manifesto was brief, summed up in just seventeen words: Do I want Independence in my life-time? Or do I want to revert to feudalism and imperialism?’ The impractical, divisive option of federalism in a country the size of Ghana was not allowed to cloud the issue.

In June 1956, the CPP recorded another impressive victory winning 71 seats including all 44 seats in the Colony and 8 out of the 21 in Ashanti. The NLM failed to win a single seat outside Ashanti. However, for all their appeal to Ashanti nationalism, the CPP won 43 percent of the votes cast in Ashanti, proving once again that although the NLM was predominantly an Ashanti party, not all Ashantis were NLM supporters.

Once again Dr J. B. Danquah failed to win his seat but that was not the only familiar outcome: again the NLM refused to accept the results of democratic elections and proceeded to derail the transitional plans toward independence. With twisted logic argued that the distribution of the votes in the 1956 election vindicated their position for a federal constitution because the CPP did not win a majority in Ashanti or the Northern Territories.

Defeating the NLM separatists and threats of partition

After the election, Nkrumah tabled the motion for independence on 3 August 1956 but NLM members of the Assembly, including Dr K. A. Busia, Mr Joe Appiah and Mr R. R. Amponsah walked out in protest and the motion passed 72-0.  As Richard Rathbone put it: "The newly elected opposition appeared unwilling to accept the results of the election which they signified by walking out of the first session of the newly elected Legislative Assembly. The NLM, once again resorted to its tried and trusted tactics of boycott, lobbying to London and threatening secession.  … The NLM continued to suggest that it would refuse to operate as a loyal opposition…" Just as Dr K. A. Busia had promised during the election campaign.
Nonetheless, soon after CPP government tabling the motion for independence, the Asante Youth Association (AYA) sent a telegram to the Secretary of State for the Colonies on 13 August 1956 stating among other things that "since the C.P.P. Government have declared themselves unwilling to call for consultations before the Motion calling for Independence, [this] shall be considered by Ashanti as repealing the Order in Council of 1901 which annexed Ashanti to the British Crown. Ashanti shall then be Sovereign and Independent state within the Commonwealth."

Despite the crushing defeat at the polls, the opposition continued to push for a federal union and made representations to the secretary of Secretary of State for the Colonies in London and called for a royal commission to look into their grievances and for a postponement of independence until it had reported. This time the British Government refused to indulge the opposition and rejected calls to postpone independence. On 17 September 1956, in response to a formal request from the CPP to the British Secretary of State to name a firm date for Independence, the Governor informed Nkrumah that 6 March 1957 had been decided upon. Amid scenes of jubilation, the news was given to the Assembly by Nkrumah on the following day 18 September 1956.

The opposition modified their position and demanded constitutional safeguards in the form of regional autonomy and a second chamber among others. The secretary of state persuaded the CPP to negotiate and following lengthy consultations with the opposition, the Asanteman and the territorial Councils, the CPP published on 8 November 1956, what became known was the Revised Constitutional Proposals for the Gold Coast. While the government accepted a measure of devolution it limited the powers of Regional Assemblies and refused to accept the opposition's call for an undertaking that Ashanti's borders would remain inviolable.

In response to the publication of the constitutional proposals, AYA ran a daily half-page advert in the Liberator (the mouthpiece of the NLM) from 9-15 Nov 1956 which declared "ASHANTI AND THE N.T.’S WILL SECEDE FROM GHANA".

On 18 November 1956, the opposition NLM and the Northern People's Party forwarded a joint resolution to the Secretary of State for the colonies stating:
 "In view of the failure to reach agreement on the constitution we now ask for separate independence for Ashanti and the Northern Territories and for a Partition Commission to divide assets and liabilities of the Gold Coast among its component territories"

Crucially, the Asanteman Council endorsed this call for partition by requesting that the United Kingdom take all necessary steps to grant separate independence for Asante and the Northern Territories on 6 March 1957.  Opposition members bragged that they retained the services of lawyers in London to draw up the necessary legal documents for secession, apply for membership of the United Nations and plans were underway to build a £500,000 House of Parliament in Ashanti.

The CPP was well aware that NLM were only seeking to delay the transition to independence and although it stuck to its guns on the powers on regional assemblies, it compromised on issues relating to future amendments to the Ghana Constitution in the full knowledge that a sovereign and elected national parliament could reverse them, if they were deemed unworkable after independence.

So it was that the "Ghana (Constitution) Order in Council", 1957 was agreed.

Independence: 6 March 1957

At midnight on 5/6 March 1957, on the Polo Ground in Accra, Nkrumah proclaimed the Independence of Ghana, To cries of FREEDOM! FREEDOM! FREEDOM! from the huge crowd the British flag was lowered, and the red, green gold flag of Ghana was raised in its place.
It was the climax of the CPP's epic campaign to bring colonial rule to an end.

The party's first objective, the battle for political freedom had been won, without resort to arms. In the words of Nkrumah on that historic night:
"At long last the battle has ended. And thus Ghana, your beloved country is free for ever."
But there would be further battles in the years ahead to build a new Ghana and to achieve Pan- African objectives. The struggle for economic independence and social justice was only just beginning.

Continued threats to national security

Even after independence, the NLM continued with violence in Kumasi and there was evidence of arms smuggling across the border from Ivory Coast to western Asante. Over 5,000 people originally living in Ashanti had been exiled as result of the NLM's violence.

While preparations for independence were underway, supporters of the Togoland Congress were busy setting up military training camps in Alavanyo as part of a plot of violent disturbances with elements of the NLM The police moved in to dismantle the camp and in the ensuing riots, three people were killed.  Two members of parliament – S. G. Antor and Mr. Kojo Ayeke – were tried, found guilty and sentenced to six years imprisonment but their convictions were quashed on appeal on a technicality.

In the meantime a group of young men in Accra led by Attoh Quarshie formed the Ga Shifimo Kpee ostensibly to defend the interests of the Ga. However this organisation soon took on a violent character, particularly through its revolutionary wing called the ‘Tokyo Joes’ of unemployed school leavers with criminal elements thrown in. They too sympathized with the NLM whose leadership was in attendance at their formal launch in Accra on 7 July 1957. Members of the Ga Shifimo Kpee circulated forged cabinet papers purporting to show the government was deliberately acting against the interests of the people from the North, the Volta region and Accra in an attempt to fan tribal hatred and disturbances.  Intelligence services reported discussions of assassination attempts and plans to kidnap senior members of the cabinet at their meetings, which members of the opposition NLM attended.

In response, CPP supporters in Accra set up a rival group, the Ga Ekomefeemo Kpee, and the two inevitably clashed notably in a demonstration outside Parliament on 20 August 1957 which led to several people being injured.

In less than year after independence members of the opposition leaders were talking about unseating the government. As early as December 1957, the leader of the opposition NLM. Dr K. A Busia was secretly soliciting funds from the United States government to undermine and destabilize the elected government of his own country. According to Mr Wilson Flake, then the US Ambassador to Ghana (see Foreign Relations, 1955–1957, Volume XVIII, pages 387–388),  the leader of the opposition and member of Parliament approached him and requested "25 thousand dollars in the US to purchase vehicles and hire party workers to offset "dangerous indoctrination" being given by CPP agents who have unlimited funds." This behaviour would have been intolerable in any country.

One foreign journalist J. H. Huizinga reported in an Israeli newspaper one such conversation which apparently took place in the first half of 1958:
" In spite of all its professed concerned for democracy, Ghana's Opposition sometimes betrays curious conceptions of the role the servants of the State should play in the political life of the country. Thus, one of its leading members told me that he would welcome a military coup d'état to unseat Nkrumah."

A number of Government intelligence reports confirmed these rumours including one that quite accurately revealed plans coup d'etat involving prominent members of the opposition with assistance from members of the Ghana Army sometime between 13 and 31 December.
Not too long after these reports the security services were tipped off by staff at Badges and & Equipment, a London shop dealing in the sale of military accoutrements, that a man who styled himself as "John Walker", had purchased replica officer uniforms, badges of rank and belts of the type used by the Ghana Army. It was established that the afore-mentioned "John Walker" was Mr R. R. Amponsah, general secretary of the United Party who ordered the replica military accoutrements to be shipped to Lome and delivered through relatives of another opposition member, Mr. Modesto K Apaloo, a member of parliament and former deputy opposition leader of the Legislative Assembly.

The order of replica Ghana army uniforms, badges of rank and belts by senior members of the opposition might appear innocuous, but they immediately reminded the government and the security services of what happened to the Burmese government in 1946. Members of the opposition members to the government of Burma, dressed in replica uniform of the Burmese army, commandeered an army vehicle, stormed the cabinet room and murdered 14 cabinet ministers. It later transpired that the opposition had attempted to recruit the Ghanaian commandant at Giffard (now Burma) Camp, Major Benjamin Ahwaitey and other NCOs in the Ghana Army to engage in a similar plot.

A quasi-judicial Commission set up by the government and chaired by Justice Granville Sharp found unanimously that both Apaloo and Amponsah had "engaged in a conspiracy to carry out at some future date in Ghana an act for unlawful purpose, revolutionary in character." Majority of the Commission held that Major Benjamin Awhaitey, Mr R. R. Amponsah, Mr. Modesto Apaloo and Mr. John Mensah Anthony (half-brother of Apaloo), were engaged in a conspiracy to assassinate the Prime Minister, Dr Kwame Nkrumah, and to carry out a coup d'état.

In response to these and other disturbances and events, the CPP government took a number of landmark decisions to preserve the security of the state, all of which were subject to extensive debates in parliament and voting.

1. Alhaji Amadu Baba the Zerikin Zongo and Alhaji Othman Larden Lalemi key leaders of the Moslem Association Party who helped the NLM orchestrate violence in Ashanti were deported in line with colonial precedent of sending such unsavoury characters back to their countries of origin. Both men were shown by Justice Sarkodee Addo's Commission (investigating the Kumasi State Council and the Asanteman Council) to have been deeply mired in NLM's violence in Ashanti region and in recruiting non-Ghanaians to carry out acts of terrorism.

2. The Government set up commissions of inquiry headed by senior judges into affairs of the Abuakwa State Council, Kumasi State Council and the Asanteman Council and they found that in many cases, public money had been illegally diverted to fund the violent activities of NLM's Action Troopers.

3. To quell the outbreak of violence and disorder along tribal lines, the Government introduced the Avoidance of Discrimination Act to prohibit the establishment of political parties based solely on ethnic, racial or religious grounds. The Act's immediate impact was to trigger the merger of the NLM, Northern People's Party (NPP), Togoland Congress, Ga Adangbe Shifomo Kpee combined to form in a single opposition party, the United Party (UP).

4. In July 1958, the government introduced the Prevention Detention Act to extend the period of pre-trial detention for suspected opposition terrorists, not dissimilar to many of the anti-terrorist legislation passed in countries such as United Kingdom, United States of America, Australia, France and other countries around the world.

CPP – Independent Ghana's first government

With independence, the CPP government at last had the political power needed to build the economic and social infrastructure necessary for Ghana to become a modern, progressive state.
The Party inherited an economy developed mainly to serve foreign interests. Education, health and other social needs of the people, improved with the implementation of the CPP's First Development Plan (1951-6), but still fell far below the high standards at which the CPP aimed. Much remained to be done.

Through Development plans the party was determined to restructure the economy so that the people, through the state would have an effective share in the economy of the country and effective control over it. The needs of the people and not so-called market principles would be the paramount consideration in economic planning.

The Consolidation Plan (1957-9), covered the first two years of Independence, giving time for the government to consolidate in preparation for the launching of a far-reaching Five Year Development Plan (1959–64). Its notable achievements include the establishment of the Bank of Ghana in July 1957, Black Star Shipping Line with SS Volta River welcomed to home port in December 1957 and opening of Broadcasting House of Radio Ghana early 1958

The second five-year development plan was launched on 1 July 1959, aimed at (a) achieving economic independence, (b) developing resources to produce a strong, healthy and balanced economy, and (c) reducing economic vulnerability by reducing dependence on cocoa as a single crop.

To lay the foundations on which socialism could be built, Ghana's economy was divided into five sectors (with no single person given the exclusive right to produce a commodity in any sector of the economy):
     State Enterprises;
     Foreign Private Enterprises;
     Enterprises jointly owned by the State and foreign private interests;
     Co-operatives; and
     Small-scale Ghanaian private enterprise (reserved to Ghanaians to encourage and utilize personal initiative and skill among Ghanaians)

The CPP's major task was rousing the spirit of devotion and sacrifice necessary for the program of development; the rewards of their endeavours being national and individual dignity resulting from the creation and a raised standard of life, that is, wealth with labour. All sections of the community had a part to play in the economic and social revolution. As Nkrumah stated:
"We are now working for Ghana regardless of party affiliations. The government will see to it that any sacrifices which the workers, whether by hand or brain, and the farmers may make, will not rob them of the fruits of their labor. The government will ensure that these sacrifices will be made for the benefit of all the people."

The Workers Brigade was formed to absorb 12,000 young men and women among elementary school-leavers, and trained in discipline, responsibility and citizenship, and skills to enable them find employment in agriculture and industry.

The Ghana Academy of Sciences was established in November 1959 to spearhead Research and Development in Ghana for modernization of agriculture and industrialization using the country's local raw material.

Over 60 new factories opened in 1961 which included; a distillery, a coconut oil factory; a brewery; a milk processing plant; and a lorry and bicycle assembly plant. Agreements signed for the establishment of an oil refinery; an iron and steel works; a flour mill; sugar factory; textile and cement factories in 1961 and the Volta River project was officially launched at Akosombo in 1961 after successfully negotiating international loans against the active campaign of opposition mounted by Dr. K.A. Busia.

In 1961 a new harbor opened and started operating in Tema, and the Volta Aluminium Company (VALCO) was formed to establish an aluminium smelter at an estimated cost of £100 million in 1962. A Unilever Soap factory started operation at Tema on 24 August 1963.

Ghana's Republic

Three years after Independence, in March 1960, proposals for a republican constitution were published. A plebiscite was then held in April, the result of which made it clear that the people of Ghana welcomed a republican constitution, and overwhelmingly voted for Nkrumah to become the first president.

On 1 July 1960, Ghana became a republic. The governor general, Lord Listowel, performed his last duty, the prorogation of parliament. The Republican constitution contained the unique provision that:
"The independence of Ghana should not be surrendered or diminished on any grounds other than the furtherance of Africa unity, that no person would suffer discrimination on grounds of sex, race, tribe, religion or political belief, and that chieftaincy in Ghana would be guaranteed and preserved. Freedom and justice would be honored and maintained".

Nkrumah was installed as president at State House on 1 July 1960. On that same day, the new president, accompanied by President Sekou Toure of Guinea and other African leaders, lit the flame of African freedom. This was to be kept burning to symbolize the CPP government's continuing, vigorous Pan-African efforts to bring about the total liberation and unity of the continent.

The second phase of economic transformation
The CPP adopted a program of "Work and Happiness" in 1962 designed to define the lines of national development to be implemented by the seven-year development Plan. The objectives were to build a socialist state devoted to the welfare of the masses, and turning Ghana into the power house of the African revolution.

In March 1964, building on the work of previous plans, the Seven Year Development plan was launched. The main tasks of the plan were to:

1. Speed up the growth off the national economy.

2. Embark upon the socialist transformation of the economy through the rapid development of state and co-operative sectors.

3. Eradicate completely the colonial structure of the economy.

There was to be a period of mixed economy, when a limited private sector would be allowed to operate. During this time, public and co-operative sectors would expand rapidly, particularly in the strategic, productive sectors of the economy. Eventually, with the complete implementation of Development Plans, a fully planned economy and a just society would be established.

The plan embodied the CPP's Program of Work and Happiness adopted at the party's Congress in July, 1962. A total expenditure £1016.0 million sterling was proposed for the plan out of which the Ghana government was to provide £G475.5 million with an average capital expenditure per year of £G68.0 million; 37.3% on Agriculture and Industry; 62.7% on Social Services and Infrastructure.

Among the achievements of the period are:

 Establishment of atomic reactor at Kwabenya
 Aluminium Smelter at Tema
 Glass Manufacturing Corporation at Aboso
 Cement works at Tema
 Government Electronics Industry at Tema
 Cocoa Processing Factories (Takoradi and Tema)
 Ghana Publishing Corporation
 Ghana Textile Corporation
 Rattan Factory at Asamankese in operation in January 1966; five factories at Nkawkaw, Enyiresi, Oppon Valley, Asanwinso and Bobikuma planned to go into operation later in 1966
 Two Coir Fibre Factories with a total capacity each of 990,000 lb. of Coir Fibre and over 1000 lb. of door and floor mats; a factory at Axim with laboratory facilities planned as training centre for Rattan, Bamboo, Coir and wood projects
 Bamboo factories being established as in January 1966 at Manso-Amenfi, Assin Foso and Axim to manufacture bamboo cups and trays
 Production to start in 1966 in the following plants: 
 Corned beef factory at Bolgatanga
 Sugar Factory at Akuse
 Television Assembly Plant at Tema (Jointly established by the Government of Ghana and Sanyo planned to be opened in March, 1966)
 Inauguration of completed Volta River Project at Akosombo on 23 January 1966
 52 State Enterprises in operations

Development of industries in all regions:

 Silos For Food and crop preservation
 Tomato and Mango Factory, Wenchi, Brong-Ahafo Region
 Match Factory, Kade, Eastern Region
 Pwalugu Tomato Factory; Upper Region
 Ghana Glass Factory, Aboso and Tarkwa, Western Region
 Akasanoma Radio Factory, Greater-Accra Region
 Gold Processing Factory, Prestea, Western Region
 Meat Processing Factory, Bolgatanga, Upper Region
 Dairy Farm at Amrahia and Avatime
 Paper Processing Factory, Takoradi, Western Region
 Pomadze Poultry Farm, Central Region
 Ghana Cement Factory, Takoradi, Western Region
 Ghana Household Utilities Manufacture, Sekondi, Western Region
 Tema Steel Company, Greater-Accra Region
 Nsawam Fruit Cannery – Greater-Accra Region

State hotels:

 Continental, Star, Meridian, Ambassador, Greater-Accra Region
 Atlantic Hotel, Western Region
 City Hotel, Ashanti Region
 Catering Rest Houses, Regional Capitals
 Ghana Black Star Line with almost fifteen ships, Takoradi and Tema
 Ghana Distilleries, Greater-Accra Region
 Ghana Shoe Factory Kumasi, Ashanti Region
 Ghana Jute Factory, Kumasi, Ashanti Region
 Tema Food Complex, Greater-Accra Region

Infrastructure:

 Ghana Atomic Energy Commission 
 Tema Harbour and Tema Township 
 Akosombo Dam (Ghana paid half of the £70 million) 
 Accra -Tema Motorway (originally meant to go through Kumasi to Paga) 
 Accra International Airport -Refurbishment
 Peduasi Lodge for conferences 
 Farmers Council 
 Workers Brigade 
 National Management and Productivity Institute 
 New Army Headquarters in Ho, Sunyani, Bolgatanga, and Takoradi

National institutions:

 Ghana Film Industries Accra
 Ghana Airways Corporation
 Ghana National Trading Corporation
 Cocoa Purchasing Company
 Bank of Ghana
 National Investment Banks
 Ghana Commercial Bank
 Agricultural Credit and Cooperative Bank (later, Agricultural Development Bank)

The austerity budget and the 1961 workers strike 
In 1961 the CPP government introduced an austerity budget to counter declining world price of cocoa while maintaining planned capital expenditure on economic expansion and industrialisation, including Tema Harbour and the new township, new industries such as the steelworks, new housing, and new schools, among others.  In response to increases in duty on consumer goods and the introduction of a compulsory saving scheme to quell rising inflation, the railways workers organized a strike to register their opposition to the austerity measures in the budget.

Nkrumah was out of the country at the time, and a delegation of the cabinet sought a meeting with representatives of the Unions but the leaders of the strike refused to meet and the government declared a state of emergency in response to what was an illegal strike under the 1958 Industrial Relations Act. After this, many workers returned to work except in Sekondi –Takoradi and surrounding areas.

As time wore on, it became clear that the union leadership had been infiltrated and come under the influence of the opposition United Party. Two leading members of the strike – Ishmaila Annan and Atta Bordoh – were executive members of the United Party in the Western region. Ishmaila Annan had been a member of the Moslem Association Party (before it became part of the U.P.) and was closely associated with the deported Amadu Baba, who orchestrated much of the NLM's violence in the run-up to independence.

A week after the strike was declared, the executive of the opposition United Party met in Dr Danquah's House in Accra. Present at the meeting were the strike leaders, Ishmaila Annan and Atta Bordoh ostensibly in their capacity as party executives and not as trade unionists or strike organisers. However, as Dr J. B. Danquah was later to confirm, the central issues for discussion at the meeting were the railway strike and the 1961-1962 budget.

At the end of the meeting, the United Party executives issued a press statement calling on the government to recall parliament and revise the budget or resign. In public, however the opposition did not condemn the illegal strike but criticized the government for failing to control it. A week after the executive meeting of the United Party, Dr J. B. Danquah travelled to Sekondi to meet with the strike leaders in Kwesi Lamptey's house in Fijai Secondary School. Those present included members of the United Party executive, and far from seeking to resolve the dispute, the meeting discussed how to steel the nerves of the striking workers and to persuade them to continue with the dispute and not to respond to Nkrumah's overtures after he had returned from his trip – these included ending the state of emergency and releasing persons arrested.

It later transpired that members of the opposition helped draft and paid for telegrams on behalf of the unions (using fictional unions names and a private mail bag address belonging to Ishmaili Annan) to International Railway and Maritime workers unions in Nigeria, U.S. and U.K. requesting for funds ostensibly to ensure the "survival of parliamentary democracy"  in Ghana. The strike was no longer about workers’ grievances against the 1961 budget, but the survival of parliamentary democracy in Ghana. It became clear that not only were the U.P. financing the strike, they were involved in the design of an illegal activity that soon took on a politically subversive tone.

Dr. K.A. Busia, who was in self-imposed exile moved to Lome to provide proximate support to the strikers and subversives, and he was joined by a number of opposition leaders including Obetsebi-Lamptey and Ekow Richardson. Dr. Busia disclosed he had been offered £50,000 to fight the democratically elected government of his country.

The government discovered that among the plans of the Lome group was a series of bomb explosions to be launched from neighbouring Togo on national monuments and at the residences of prominent ministers orchestrated by the personal assistant to K. A. Gbedemah (who had by now become estranged from the CPP administration)  Victor Yaw de Grant Bempong.

It became clear that as in 1954, when a defeated opposition took advantage of the grievances of farmers to re-launch itself on the political stage, having lost the 1960 elections, they were once gain taking advantage of the genuine grievances of working people about an austere budget to bring down the elected government of Ghana. This time the colonial government was not around to indulge them and the CPP took decisive action and leading members of opposition politicians including Dr. Danquah and Joe Appiah were arrested under prevention detention for the first time in the three years since the Act had been introduction.

Pan-Africanism

In the wider context, the CPP's Pan-African policy was expressed in the famous words of Nkrumah at the end of his midnight speech at Independence.

‘The Independence of Ghana is meaningless unless it is linked up with the total liberation of the African continent’
       
With Independence, the Party was in a position to embark on a practical program of Pan-Africanism. This involved meaningful support for Africa's freedom fighters and the taking of effective steps to advance African unity.

In 1957, there were only eight independent African states. They were Ghana, Ethiopia, Libya, Tunisia, Morocco, Egypt, Liberia and Sudan. Most of the African continent was yet to be liberated. The last Pan-African Congress had been held in Manchester, England in 1945.

The CPP government was determined to reactivate the Pan-African Movement on the soil of Africa its true home. Practical steps were taken.

1. In April 1958 the Conference of African Independent States was held in Accra. The eight states agreed to co-ordinate economic planning; to improve communications; to exchange cultural and educational information; to assist liberation movements by providing training and other facilities. Most important was the adoption of the formula of one man one vote as an objective of the liberation movement. This gave the liberation movement direction and cohesion.

2. In December 1958, the All-African People's Conference was held in Accra. This Conference represented Africa's freedom fighters, nationalist parties, trade unions, co-operative and youth movements throughout Africa. It was the first time that freedom fighters from European colonies and white-minority regimes in Africa had met together to discuss common problems and to formulate plans. History was made when the Conference endorsed the right of the unliberated to use all methods of struggle, including armed struggle, if non-violent methods to obtain freedom had failed.

At the Conference were Patrice Lumumba, Kenneth Kaunda, Kanyama Chiume, Tom Mboya, Oginga Odinga, Joshua Nkomo and many others who were to become notable political leaders.
Conference members returned to their countries with a common purpose to liberate their countries. They were inspired as never before, and confident in the CPP government's commitment to the Pan-African struggle. On obtaining independence, they were to follow Ghana's example in making their territories base areas for freedom fighters. Ghana had become the pace-maker of the Pan-African Movement.

1. Among liberation movements which received aid and training in Ghana during the government of the CPP were:

 ANC (African National Congress)
 PAC (Pan Africanist Congress)
 ZANU (Zimbabwe African National Union)
 ZAPU (Zimbabwe African People's Union)
 MPLA (Popular Movement for the Liberation
of Angola)

 SWAPO (South West African People's Organisation
 FRELIMO (Front for the Liberation of Mozambique)

Steps towards African unification

1. Ghana-Guinea Union, November 1958
This was to mark the start of the actual process of unification by setting up a nucleus union which other states could join as and when they wished. The CPP and the PDG (Parti Democratique de Guinee) shared the same Pan-African objectives, and followed a similar path of social and economic development.

2. Ghana-Guinea-Mali Union, April 1961
This was formed when President Modibo Keita of Mali joined President Sekou Toure of Guinea and President Nkrumah in Accra and agreed on a Charter for the Union of African States (UAS) which was open to other states to join. The UAS reaffirmed support for the liberation movement and agreed that an African Common Market should be formed.

3. Ghana-Congo Agreement, August 1960
The outcome of a secret meeting in Accra between Nkrumah and Patrice Lumumba, then Prime Minister of the Congo. They agreed to form a political union, a republican constitution within a federal framework. The capital to be Kinshasa (then Leopoldville). The Agreement was never implemented because of the fall of Lumumba's government the following month and his subsequent assassination.

The CPP government, throughout its tenure of power, demonstrated time and again the possibility of achieving a degree of unity between states with differing historical backgrounds, language, culture and institutions. As expressed by Nkrumah: ‘The forces that unite us are intrinsic, and greater than the superimposed influences that keep us apart. It is not just our colonial past, or the fact that we have aims in common. It is something which goes far deeper. I can best describe it as a sense of oneness in that we are Africans’

The Organisation of African Unity (OAU), May 1963

The foundation of the OAU was the culmination of the CPP government's initiative to establish the political machinery for the unification of Africa. The Charter of the OAU was signed in Addis Ababa on 25 May 1963 by the Heads of State and Governments of 32 African independent states.

All the signatories were agreed on the principles of African liberation and unity. But they differed on questions of procedure and priorities. While some advocated a gradualist approach, emphasis being on economic, cultural and regional groupings, others led by Ghana considered it essential to provide political machinery to plan liberation and development on a continental scale. It was consistently the Party's view that Africa's huge natural and human resources could only be developed to the full for the well-being of the African people as a whole if Africa was united.

These differences and the lack of provision for an All-African High Command to provide strength to enforce OAU decisions meant that the Charter was one of intent rather than of positive action. Later OAU Summit Conferences also failed to agree to the setting up of effective political machinery.

The final OAU Summit held during the period of CPP government was in Accra in 1965. The Party's attempt to establish a full-time OAU Executive Council narrowly failed to obtain the required number of votes.

Nkrumah predicted that the continued failure of Africa to unite would mean ‘stagnation, instability and confusion, making Africa an easy prey to foreign interference and confusion’. He warned that the independent states would be ‘picked off one by one’. As he remarked in 1965: "It is courage that we lack."

African Personality

The concept of the African Personality is an important aspect of CPP thinking. Nkrumah described it as a "reawakening consciousness among Africans and peoples of African descent of the bonds which unite us — our historical past, our culture, our common experience and our aspirations". It was expressed by the CPP government through:

1. Africanisation to break down old colonial structures and personnel in the civil service, armed forces and police. To eradicate the "colonial mentality". It was not based on racism. Foreigners were welcomed to work in Ghana provided they were sincerely committed to CPP objectives.

2. Bureau of African Affairs in Accra set up to administer to the needs of Africa's freedom fighters.

3. Institute of African Studies opened in 1963 as part of the University of Ghana. Attached to the institute was the School of Performing Arts. A Dance Ensemble and a national Orchestra were formed to express both modern and traditional culture.

4. First Africanist Conference in Accra 1962 to plan a comprehensive programme of research into all aspects of Africa's history, culture, thought and human and material resources. Results of research to be published in an Encyclopedia Africana. Eminent US scholars Dr W. E. B. DuBois and Dr W. Alphaeus Hunton had years before the conference been invited to Ghana to work on the project.

5. Links with peoples of African descent in the Diaspora. Ghana during the time of the CPP government was described as ‘the very fountainhead of Pan-Africanism’. (Malcolm X after a visit to Ghana in 1964)
6. George Padmore Research Library on African Affairs opened in Accra in 1961

African Voice in World Affairs

The emergence of a distinctive African voice in world affairs was something new in international relations. It was another direct result of CPP policy after Independence, which generated a remarkable succession of developments throughout Africa and the Diaspora.
Africans were no longer prepared to be silent spectators in world affairs.

Non-Aligned Movement

Ghana and African countries obtained independence soon after they emerged on the world political scene when the "cold war" between the US and the USSR dominated international affairs. The nuclear arms race was at its height. The world seemed on the brink of war. The Non-Aligned Movement offered hope of a Third Force holding the balance of power and thus avoiding war. In this political climate, newly independent states of Africa and Asia adopted a non-aligned stand.
Among the most notable leaders of the Non-Aligned Movement were President Nkrumah representing the CPP government, President Jawaharlal Nehru of India, President Abdul Nasser of Egypt, President Tito of Yugoslavia and President Sukarno of Indonesia.

Relationships with Asia and Latin America

In May 1965, the CPP government hosted the 4th Afro-Asian Solidarity Conference. Nkrumah emphasized how much more effective Africa's human and material resources would be when mobilized under a continental Union Government.

Nkrumah, Ben Barka, leading Moroccan opposition figure, and Fidel Castro were responsible for the formation of Organisation of Solidarity with the Peoples of Africa, Asia and Latin America (OSPAAL) which sought to maintain independence from both the USSR and China. At that time, relations between China and the USSR were very strained.

The CPP and the United Nations Organisation (UNO)

The emergence of a meaningful African voice in the largest of international bodies, the UN, may be traced to the period of the CPP government.

The Ghana government actively supported the peace-keeping work of the UN in the Congo between 1960 and 1964. Ghanaian troops formed part of the UN operation when Lumumba in 1960 appealed for military assistance after Moise Tshombe announced the secession of Katanga.
But having supported UN intervention, Ghana¬ian troops found themselves part of a UN force engaged in operations which resulted in the fall and consequent murder of Lumumba, the leader of the very government which had sought UN support. The experience confirmed the CPP view that African solutions had to be found for African problems.

In 1963, the Ghanaian delegation at the UN discussed with the Africa Group a plan for an All-African force to be sent to the Congo. The establishing of an All-African High Com¬mand to maintain peace in Africa instead of relying on outside forces such as the UN or NATO remained a key objective of the Party.

The CPP and the Commonwealth

Ghana remained a member of the Commonwealth throughout the years of CPP government and its role was critical in the work of Commonwealth Conferences when African issues were discussed. This became very apparent during the time of the crisis in (then) Rhodesia when it became clear in 1964 that the settler government was moving towards a unilateral declaration of independence (UDI).

At the 1965 Commonwealth Conference in London, African and Asian countries agreed a common line in opposing UDI. This was largely a result of Nkrumah's efforts. The Conference agreed that the principle of one man one vote should be applied to Rhodesia, and that there should be unimpeded progress to majority rule.

When in 1965 UDI was declared, the CPP government drew up proposals for joint action by African states to assist in the overthrow of the Ian Smith settler regime, and to go to the help of any African state attacked or threatened by it. In addition, Ghana indicated an intention to leave the Commonwealth.

The reputation of Ghana was further enhanced when largely owing to the efforts of Nkrumah, apartheid South Africa was forced to leave the Commonwealth. Ghana could not remain a member of an organisation containing the racialist minority government of South Africa. The British government had to choose between Ghana and South Africa. Britain chose Ghana. It was a measure of the stature of the CPP government. Britain knew that if Ghana left the Commonwealth, many African states would follow Ghana's lead.

Attempts to destabilize the CPP Government

In late 1961, only a few months after the Opposition inspired and sponsored Railway Strike, Accra witnessed a series of bomb outrages organized by the Opposition based in Lome. These bomb outrages preceded the planned visit of Her Majesty Queen Elizabeth II in 1962, and were designed by the Opposition to create the impression of Ghana being unsafe for the visit. The now infamous Kulungugu bomb outrage followed in August 1962, and led to the brutal and cowardly murder of a young girl carrying a bouquet of flowers meant for Nkrumah, in which a bomb had been concealed by the Opposition. Following the Kulungugu bomb outrage, a series of organized grenade attacks occurred in Accra, one of these targeted Young Pioneers children on a route march near the Princess Marie Louise Children's hospital. The Opposition Member of Parliament R. B. Ochere and UP activist Yaw Manu pleaded guilty for their role in the Kulungugu bomb, and as Dennis Austin stated in "Politics in Ghana 1946 – 1960" published in 1964: "That the plots [Kulungugu and the other bombing outrages] had been hatched in Lome and elsewhere by former Opposition members – notably Obetsebi Lamptey – was clear".

In January 1964, an assassination attempt on Nkrumah by the armed Constable Ametewee on duty at Flagstaff House resulted in the killing of Superintendent Salifu Dargati. In course of these terrorist bombing outrages by the Opposition, a death toll of 30 Ghanaians, men, women and children, had been recorded with over 300 injured and maimed for life.

All these terrorist bomb outrages at destabilizing the CPP government were to be followed by the subversion and overthrow of the CPP government in February 1966.

24 February 1966

While on his way as leader of the British Commonwealth mission to seek a resolution to the Vietnam crisis, the CPP government was overthrown by a military junta and members of the Ghana Police who had since 1964 at least, been working with the Central Intelligence Agency (CIA) of the United States to bring about a change in government.

For some hours, the presidential Guard Regiment of Flagstaff House resisted fiercely, but was eventually forced to surrender. There was no popular participation in the coup. The ordinary people were initially stunned.

The military/police junta co-opted key members of the opposition such as Dr. K. A. Busia, who was on the junta's political committee, and Mr. Victor Owusu, who became the military junta's attorney general. The Preventive Detention Act was repealed and replaced by the Preventive Custody Degree with two modifications: (1) detainees could make no appeal and (2) there was no requirement to inform them as to why they were being arrested.

Troops and police rounded up key CPP personnel and flung them into prison. Practically the entire Party leadership throughout the country was arrested. Included were all cabinet ministers, members of Parliament, officials of CPP and all its subsidiary, associate organisations including trade union leaders.

With Nkrumah out of the country en route to Vietnam with peace proposals, with all the key points in Accra seized, and with the CPP leadership arrested, immediate effective resistance was out of the question. The military / police junta installed itself in power, declaring the CPP government abolished and the Party banned. Members of the CPP were banned from participating in party political activity for the next thirteen years until 1979.

Conakry and the wilderness years
The party lived on in Conakry, Guinea where Nkrumah and his entourage stayed from 1966 to 1972 at the invitation of President Sekou Toure and the PDG. It lived on underground in Ghana, surfacing from time to time under different party names. The CPP remained alive and grew even stronger in the Pan-Africa Movement, for the reactionary coup in Ghana was not a domestic matter affecting only the people of Ghana. The coup was to have, repercussions for the whole of the African people, on the continent and worldwide.

Nkrumah and his entourage arrived in Guinea on 2 March 1966 and in an unprecedented expression of Pan-Africanism, Nkrumah was appointed co-president in Conakry, and became the central point both for the effort to restore constitutional government in Ghana and for the continuance of CPP Pan-African objectives.

The struggle was pursued through:

1. Organisation: The preparation of practical plans for a return to Ghana and the restoration of constitutional government.

2. Broadcasts to the people of Ghana by Nkrumah on Guinea's Voice of the African Revolution.

3. Close contact with CPP support groups both inside Ghana, in the UK, in the Diaspora, throughout Africa and elsewhere.

4. Books, pamphlets and statements by Nkrumah. These were published by Panaf Books Ltd., a company establishment in the UK to publish and distribute the works of Nkrumah's since his previous UK publishers were not willing to publish his writings after the fall of his government.

5. The magazine Africa and the World, a London-based monthly magazine, founded in 1960 and sponsored by the CPP government. It had a world-wide readership and a high reputation for progressive and accurate reporting. After the coup the magazine managed to continue publishing the truth about Ghana and Africa until 1971 when lack of funds forced it to close.

A Political Committee was formed by members of Nkrumah's entourage, as part of a politicization program. Its first task was to examine the causes and aftermath of the Coup in Ghana. What were the internal and external forces behind it? What lessons could be learned?
These were the questions discussed among Party members in Ghana and elsewhere. How, when Ghanaians enjoyed one of the highest standards of living in Africa, could there have been sufficient Ghanaians, willing to collude with the CPP government? Why the defections of some key CPP officials? How was it that the Party's extensive program of political education failed to prevent the coup?

The following were among some of the conclusion reached by the Political Committee

1. The main external forces behind the coup were the intelligence agencies of the US, Britain and West Germany.

2. There were certain deficiencies: in the Party, its integral "wings" and in the Civil Service, state corporation, armed forces and police. For example, there was mismanagement of some state farms, waste of equipment, inefficiency and lack of ‘political orientation’.

Underlying most of the Political Committee's Report and recommendations for action on the Party's return to power was the need to stress the importance of educating the masses to know and understand the policies and method of the CPP, necessary to build a society based on Pan-African socialist principles.

It was a lack of political awareness among the people and not any underlying fault of party principles and policies.

CPP Overseas

Through meetings, demonstrations, seminars and so on, and their bulletin The Dawn, member of the Party in London showed their continuing loyalty to the CPP, refusing to accept the military junta's assertion that the Party was abolished.

The CPP. Overseas issued a statement on the same day as the coup (24 February 1966), condemning the military action and pledging support for the constitutional government.

External Nkrumah groupings
From 1966 onwards, Nkrumaists in Britain, Europe, throughout Africa and elsewhere formed organisations committed to the political philosophy of Nkrumah. Each claimed to be the authentic voice of Nkrumaism. But they differed in their interpretation of the term, what it implied, and also the procedures to follow. They spoke of "Nkrumaism" rather than the CPP.
Disunity of the various groups each claiming to be Nkrumaist was caused largely by lack of ideological clarity. Confusion concerning Nkrumaist parties which mushroomed in Ghana over the years was also a factor in continued frustration and failure to unite.

The Death of Kwame Nkrumah

‘The Greatest African’, the words which Sekou Toure ordered to be inscribed on the coffin of Nkrumah, died at 8:45 am on 27 April 1972, in Bucharest, Romania. He had been unwell for some time but had refused to leave Guinea for medical treatment until August 1971.

On 30 April, three days after his death, Kwame Nkrumah returned to Africa. The Guinean government had arranged for his body to be preserved, placed in a special coffin and flown to Conakry.

For two days, on 13 and 14 May 1972, funeral ceremonies were held in Conakry, attended by representatives of liberation movements, governments, progressive parties and movements from Africa and elsewhere.

On 7 July 1972, after weeks of negotiations between the Guinean government and the military regime in Ghana, the coffin of Kwame Nkrumah was flown to Accra.  Flags flew at half mast while the coffin was lying-in-state at State House and a memorial service was held. Then on 9 July it was taken to Nkroful where it was placed in a tomb on the site of his birthplace.

The final resting place of "The Greatest African" and founder of the Convention People's Party, is in a marble mausoleum in a beautiful Memorial Park on the site of the Polo Ground in Accra, where Kwame Nkrumah declared the Independence of Ghana on 6 March 1957. The Re-interment ceremony took place on 1 July 1992, the thirty-second anniversary of the Republic of Ghana.

1979–1981: Back in Government

Although the ban on party politics was lifted by the military regime of General Akuffo in the late 1970s, the CPP remained banned and the party name and symbol could not be used. The CPP regrouped in the People's National Party (P.N.P.) under the leadership of Alhaji Imoru Egala, who had become the father of the party. He, however, remained ineligible to contest in the 1979 election as result of the party political decrees of the National Liberation Council that overthrew the CPP in 1966.

In his place, Dr. Hilla Limann was elected the party's presidential candidate while Egala tried to clear his name. The P.N.P. won the 1979 elections and Dr. Hilla Limann became president of Ghana. Unfortunately however, on 31 December 1981, his government was overthrown by Flight Lieutenant Jerry John Rawlings, who went to govern the country first as military dictator in the Provisional National Defence Council (P.N.D.C.) and as first president of the fourth republic leading the National Democratic Party (N.D.C.) he founded while in office.

The Fourth Republic

When the ban on party politics was lifted again in 1992, the CPP was unable to organise and rally around any leader. Imoru Egala had died, and, although Dr. Hilla Limann was still alive, he was not accorded the recognition as leader of the party.

A number of splinter groups emerged, including the People's National Convention (PNC) led by D. Hilla Limann, the National Convention Party (NCP) led by Kow Nkensen Arkaah, who later became vice president to Rawlings, the People's Heritage Party and many others led by previous party stalwarts such as the former Minister for Education Mr Kwaku Boateng. All the splinter parties contested the 1992 elections and lost massively.

There were realignments before the 1996 election, but with the exception of the PNC, now led by D. Edward Mahama, most of the other Nkrumaist parties had entered a ‘Grand Alliance’ and supported the presidential ambitions of the leader of the New Patriotic Party, John Agyekum Kufour.

On 22 August 2020, Ivor Greenstreet was elected as the flag bearer for the 2020 elections. He garnered 213 votes and his competitors split the votes as Bright Akwetey gathered 27 and Divine Ayivor had 14 votes. Ivor Kobina Greenstreet represented the party in the 2016 elections hence this forms the second time he represents the party at the national level.

Campaign to lift the ban on the CPP

Resistance to the banning of the CPP dates back to the February 1966 coup when the CPP government was overthrown and all political activity banned.
For many years, while military regimes were in power, opposition to the ban had to be covert. Later, when political activity was permitted, attempts were openly made to get the ban in the CPP lifted. The matter was pursued through the Ghana judiciary, but without success. Nevertheless, Nkrumaists in Ghana and overseas continued to work tirelessly, organising pressure groups, appeals, demonstrations, petitions and so on. It was a campaign destined never to end until victory, when Nkrumaists could once again gather under the banner of the ‘C.P.P.’, the historic Party name indelibly imprinted in the minds off all true Nkrumaists.

The Convention Party (CP)

In 1998, with parliamentary and presidential elections due to take place in December 2000, it was essential to register a party without further delay, to allow sufficient time to organise an efficient election campaign. If the "C.P.P." could not be registered, then the nearest equivalent had to be chosen.

The Convention Party was reborn on 11 August 1998 when the party received its final certificate of registration from the Electoral Commission. In the words of an Nkrumaist: "The C.P. is the C.P.P.". It was the mainstream Nkrumaist formation, comprising the PHP, NIP, PPDD, the Nkrumaist Caucus, NCP, and sections of the PNC. The Party retained the cockerel symbol of the CPP, and its motto: FORWARD EVER, BACKWARD NEVER. The experienced CPP veteran, Comrade Koko Botsio was appointed Interim Chairman of the Party.

Impetus for the merger of Nkrumaist forces which resulted in the formation of the CP had come from the grassroots, notably from the youth. This augured well for the future, as did the CP's clearly stated adoption of Nkrumaism as its political philosophy.

The CPP is un-banned
Before the 2000 elections however, the CPP was un-banned and has since contested the 2000 and 2004 election

Key Dates in the Party's History

In the history of every country there are landmark dates marking decisive turning points. Landmark dates in Ghana's history are all connected with the CPP.

12 JUNE 1949                Birth of the CPP

6 March 1957                Independence

1 July 1960                 Republic Day

24 February 1966            Re-Dedication Day

12 June 1999                50th birthday of the CPP

Party Calendar

24 February Re-Dedication Day

6 March Independence Day

27 April Founder's death

12 June Party's anniversary

1 July Republic Day

21 September Founder's birthday

Years of Publication

1945 – Towards Colonial Freedom

1957 – Autobiography To my Mother’

1961 – I Speak of Freedom ‘Dedicated to Patrice Lumumba, late Prime Minister of the Republic of the Congo, and to all those who are engaged in the struggle for the political unification of Africa’.

1963 – Africa Must Unite ‘Dedicated to George Padmore (1900-1959), and to the African that
must be ‘.

1964 – Consciencism: Philosophy and Ideology for Decolonisation

1965 – Neo-Colonialism: The Last Stage of Imperialism (This book is dedicated to the Freedom Fighters of Africa living and dead).

1966 – Challenge of the Congo: A Case Study of Foreign pressures in an Independence State ‘A Ahmed Sekou Toure Mon Frere de Combat Au Bureau Politique national du Parti Democratique de Guinee, et au Vaillant Peuples de Guinee, Aux Peuples Africains et aux Courageux Militants pour la Cause Secree du progress African dans la Liberte et La Liberte et l’Unite du Continent’.

1966 – Axioms: Freedom Fighters Edition

1967 – Voice from Conakry

1968 -Dark Days in Ghana "To Major General Barwah, Lieutenant S. Arthur and Lieutenant M. Yeboah and all Ghanaians killed and injured resisting the traitors of the 24th February 1966".

1968 – Handbook of Revolutionary Warfare: A Guide to the Armed Phase of the African Revolution ‘To the African guerrilla’.

1968 – Ghana: The Way Out (Pamphlet); The Spectre of Black Power (Pamphlet); The Struggle Continues (Pamphlet)

1969 – Two Myths (Pamphlet); The Big Lie (Pamphlet)

1970 – Revised edition of Consciencism
 
At the elections on 7 December 2004, the party won three out of 230 seats. Its candidate in the presidential elections, George Aggudey, won only 1.0% of the vote.

In the 2008 presidential and parliamentary elections, the party won one parliamentary seat for Kwame Nkrumah's daughter, Samia Nkrumah in the Jomoro constituency. The presidential candidate, Paa Kwesi Nduom, performed below expectation, managing to get 1.4% of total valid votes.

In June 2018 the party was admitted in the Socialist International as consultative member.

National Executives
The Convention People's Party holds its national delegates convention every fours to elect a new set of executives to lead.

It held its most recent election at the Eastern region on the 22nd of August 2020 to elect a flagbearer and set of executives to lead the party.

Below are the current national executives:

Electoral history

Presidential elections

Parliamentary elections

See also 
Nkrumah government

Notes

Sources:
1. https://adesawyerr.wordpress.com/2017/03/01/history-of-the-cpp/
2. Kwame Nkrumah, Ghana: The Autobiography of Kwame Nkrumah, 1956
3. Kwame Nkrumah, I Speak of Freedom, 1962
4. Kwame Nkrumah, Africa Must Unite, 1962

External links
CPP website.
Convention People's Party page at GhanaWeb.
 

1949 establishments in Gold Coast (British colony)
1966 disestablishments in Ghana
1996 establishments in Ghana
African resistance to colonialism
Consultative member parties of the Socialist International
Formerly banned socialist parties
History of Ghana
Nkrumaist political parties
Pan-Africanism in Ghana
Pan-Africanist political parties in Africa
Parties of one-party systems
Political parties disestablished in 1966
Political parties established in 1949
Political parties established in 1996
Political parties in Ghana
Resistance to the British Empire
Socialist parties in Ghana